Cola lukei is a species of flowering plant in the family Malvaceae. It is found only in Tanzania. Its natural habitat is subtropical or tropical moist lowland forests. It is threatened by habitat loss.

This particular species was discovered by graduate students Catharine Muir and Iddi Rajabu in 1999 and subsequently named after botanist Quentin Luke.

References

lukei
Endemic flora of Tanzania
Endangered flora of Africa
Taxonomy articles created by Polbot
Taxa named by Martin Cheek